Platynochaetus setosus is a species of hoverfly, from the family Syrphidae, in the order Diptera. It can be found from March to May in evergreen oak (Quercus ilex) woodland in Spain, Portugal and other countries around the western mediterranean.

References

Diptera of Europe
Syrphinae
Insects described in 1794